The Chapel of San Bartolomé is a funerary chapel in the historic centre of Córdoba, Spain. It is dated between 1390 and 1410. Richly decorated, it is one of the city's finest examples of Mudéjar art.

History
Located on the Calle Averroes in today's Faculty of Arts building, the relatively unknown chapel is one of the city's most notable monuments. With the development of the Alcázar Viejo district in 1391 and the later expulsion of the Jews from La Judería, the parish of San Bartolomé was established while a church of the same name was constructed between 1399 and 1410. The little building continued to operate as a parish church until the 17th century, possibly awaiting completion of a larger church. Restored in 1953 and 2006, the chapel is a fine example of ancient Mudéjar art.

Architecture
Rectangular in shape, the area is divided into two sections, one for the chapel itself, the other for a courtyard. The chancel is slightly higher than the remainder of the building. There are two doors, one through a porch opening into a courtyard on Calle Averroes, the second, strangely locked from the outside, providing access into a side chapel which may have been connected to a sacristy in another building.

The entrance from the courtyard has a pointed arch with a few simple decorations while the other entrance, also pointed, has zigzag or sawtooth decorations. Two small columns bearing Islamic decorations with scrolls and leaves support the elegantly rib-vaulted ceiling. The interior walls are richly decorated with yeseria plasterwork and tiling while the floor is also decorated with alternating tiles. The wall decorations combine depictions of plants, geometric patterns and heraldry. The coats of arms belong to the Knights of the Band, an order created by King Alfonso XI. Inscriptions are in both Kufic and Naskh scripts.

Listing
The chapel has been listed as a historic monument since 1931.

References

External links

Roman Catholic churches in Córdoba, Spain
Roman Catholic chapels in Spain
Historic centre of Córdoba, Spain
Bien de Interés Cultural landmarks in the Province of Córdoba (Spain)
Azulejos in buildings in Andalusia
Buildings and structures completed in 1410
Funerary art
Mudéjar architecture in Andalusia